Luckman is a surname. Notable people with the surname include:

 Adrian Luckman, 20th and 21st century British glaciologist and professor of geology
 Andrew Luckman (born 1972), retired British sport shooter, brother of David Luckman
 Arthur Luckman (1857–1921), Anglican Archdeacon of Calcutta from 1907 to 1911
 Charles Luckman (1909–1999), American businessman, property developer, and architect
 David Luckman (born 1976), British sport shooter
 Ernest Luckman (1926–1988), English rugby league footballer
 Paul Luckman, one of two Australian soldiers who murdered a teenage boy in 1982
 Sid Luckman (1916–1998), American football player